A number of steamship have been named Marietta or similarly.
 , a British cargo ship in service 1946–59
 , A British cargos ships in service 1940–43, torpedoed and sunk by U-160

Ship names